The New River (Tsnungwe/Hupa Language: yiduq' nilin),   (Karuk: akráah kumásaamvaroo), is a  tributary of the Trinity River in northern California. The river was named by miners during the California Gold Rush in the early 1850s. While prospecting west from earlier diggings on the upper Trinity River, they named the river due to it being a "new" place to search for gold.

Geography
The New River originates in the Salmon Mountains at the confluence of Virgin Creek and Slide Creek, in the western part of the Shasta-Trinity National Forest. The river initially runs south, until the confluence with the East Fork New River, where it turns southwest. It then receives Quimby Creek and passes Denny, one of several small communities originally established by Gold Rush miners.

History
New River had a rich history of Native Americans: Tsnungwe including the tł'oh-mitah-xwe.  Chimariko came in seasonally to hunt, and New River Shasta/Konomihu visited from other side of the Salmon River divide.

Recreation
The New River contains rapids ranging from class I to almost class V, with flows ranging from 400-1000+ cfs, and is run mainly by advanced kayakers and rafters. The entire main stem of the river was designated a National Wild and Scenic River in 1980. With the exception of a few small settlements along the New River, most of the watershed is remote, isolated backcountry that is seldom visited.

References

External links
 California creeks.com
  Tsnungwe Official Website

Rivers of Trinity County, California
Trinity River (California)
Tributaries of the Klamath River
Rivers of Northern California
Wild and Scenic Rivers of the United States